The whalesucker (Remora australis) is a species of remora in the family Echeneidae, so named because it attaches itself exclusively to cetaceans. It is found worldwide in tropical and warm waters; in the Gulf of Mexico and western Atlantic Ocean, it occurs from Texas to Brazil, and in the eastern Pacific Ocean, it occurs from Vancouver Island to Chile. It is the rarest member of the remora family, though this may reflect more the uncommon collection of cetaceans in the wild rather than the whalesucker's actual abundance.

The adhesive disk atop the head of the whalesucker is the largest amongst the remoras, bearing 25-28 lamellae and measuring 47-59% of the standard length. The head itself measures 26-28% of the standard length. The dorsal fin rays number 23–26, the anal fin rays 24–26, and the pectoral fin rays 22–24. The jaws contain numerous large, stout canine teeth; the palatine and lingual patches are absent, and there are 17-20 gill rakers. The coloration is uniform brown, dark brown, or greyish-brown on the head, trunk, and fins. Whalesuckers observed off Fernando de Noronha ranged from light grey to slate grey, with lighter fin margins. The smaller individuals are barred or blotched, while individuals over 35 cm long have yellowish fins. This species can reach   in total length.

The most common host of the whalesucker appears to be the blue whale. Chitinous material indicative of parasitic copepods or amphipods have been found in the stomachs of whalesuckers, suggesting a mutualistic relationship with their hosts. Off Fernando de Noronha, whalesuckers down to small juveniles are associated with spinner dolphins, and are likely recruited year-round from flotsam. The whalesuckers, no more than three to a host, usually attach to the flanks or belly of the dolphin, which may serve to minimize drag and facilitate feeding. When approached, they, especially small individuals, will shift to the opposite side of the host for protection. Whalesuckers impose a hydrodynamic cost to their host, their adhesive disks can abrade the skin, and they sometimes attach to inconvenient locations, such as near the blowhole or the genitals. The spinning behavior of dolphins, sharks, and other remora hosts has been proposed as a means of dislodging them. The whalesuckers feed on parasites and sloughed-off skin, and also forage on feces and vomit from the dolphins.

References

Remora (genus)
Fish described in 1840
Taxa named by Frederick Debell Bennett